Pseudopostega ferruginea is a moth of the family Opostegidae. It is endemic to the West Indies, where it has been found in Puerto Rico and St. Thomas.

The length of the forewings is 2.1-2.9 mm. Adults are mostly white. Adults have been collected in March and July.

Etymology
The specific name is derived from the Latin ferruginus (reddish brown, rust-colored), as suggested by the reddish brown, forewing apical band diagnostic for this species.

External links
A Revision of the New World Plant-Mining Moths of the Family Opostegidae (Lepidoptera: Nepticuloidea)

Opostegidae
Moths described in 2007